Victor-Eugène McCarty (also Macarty, McCarthy or Macarthy, born between 1817 and 1823), a Louisiana Creole, was one of the first of several prominent free black composers in New Orleans, best known for publishing Fleurs de salon: 2 Favorite Polkas in 1854. In the 1840s he was among the first black men to study music abroad, at the Paris Conservatory.

He studied in Paris. McCarty did not publish as widely as many of his fellow Creole composers of the era, but he was well known for performing and organizing other musicians, and playing a role in Reconstruction-era politics.

He served on a school board when he was targeted by white supremacist White Leaguers opposed to integration. They had also driven African American state legislators out of office and assassinated one of them, John Gair. McCarty was beaten near death and spent months recovering as a refugee.from his home.

References

Biography

Other works cited
 
 
 

American male composers
American composers
Year of birth uncertain
Year of death unknown